Robert Muirhead McNeil (born 1 November 1962) is a Scottish former footballer who played in the Football League for Hull City, Lincoln City, Preston North End  and Carlisle United.

References

External links
 

Scottish footballers
English Football League players
1962 births
Living people
Hull City A.F.C. players
Lincoln City F.C. players
Preston North End F.C. players
Carlisle United F.C. players
Bridlington Town A.F.C. players
Association football defenders